The Natrayat Rajputs are Hindu caste found in the state of Rajasthan in India.

History and origin

The community derives its name from the word nata, which means widow remarriage in Hindi. This practice, initially adopted by a group of Chauhan Rajputs in Marwar, Rajasthan, and this led to their separation from the wider Rajput community, which disallows widow remarriage. The community also include a small number Panwar, Parihar and Rathore.  The Natrayat are distributed in the transitional zone between Mewar and Marwar, occupying several villages in this hilly region.

Present circumstances

The community is endogamous, and divided into exogamous gotras, the Chadana, Kharwad Unthed solanki Rathore Sisodiya Parmar Mundawat Tanwar. They are mainly a community of small peasants farmers.

See also

Lok Rajput

References

Indian castes
Social groups of Rajasthan
Rajput clans of Rajasthan
Rajput clans